Ralph Arlyck is an American documentary filmmaker. He has won many awards for his films and has been shown at film festivals including Sundance, New York, London, and Cannes.

An alumnus of Colgate University, his first major film was Sean, a short film which features the story of four-year-old Sean Farrell growing up in the Haight-Ashbury section of San Francisco in 1969. It received wide acclaim in the United States and Europe for its frank portrayal of the 1960s counterculture. Among its fans was French director François Truffaut, whose own film, The Wild Child, played alongside Sean at the Cannes Film Festival. Arlyck revisited Farrell in the 2005 follow-up documentary, Following Sean, which received similar praise at international film festivals.

Arlyck's other works include An Acquired Taste, Godzilla Meets Mona Lisa, and Current Events.

References

External links

Sean on PBS.org
Following Sean Official website

American documentary filmmakers
Colgate University alumni
Living people
Year of birth missing (living people)